Tychicus is a genus of huntsman spiders that was first described by Eugène Louis Simon in 1880.

Species
 it contains five species, found in Indonesia, the Philippines, and Papua New Guinea:
Tychicus erythrophthalmus Simon, 1897 – Philippines
Tychicus gaymardi Simon, 1880 – Papua New Guinea (Bismarck Arch.)
Tychicus genitalis Strand, 1911 – New Guinea
Tychicus longipes (Walckenaer, 1837) (type) – Indonesia (Ambon)
Tychicus rufoides Strand, 1911 – Admiralty Is.

See also
 List of Sparassidae species

References

Araneomorphae genera
Sparassidae
Spiders of Asia
Spiders of Oceania